Two types of subdivisions of Russia uses the designation "autonomous":
autonomous okrug (administrative division)
autonomous oblast (federal subject)
The republics of Russia have a degree of autonomy, but are not labeled as "autonomous".

See also
Autonomous administrative division
Autonomous administrative divisions of the People's Republic of China
Autonomous administrative divisions of India

Political divisions of Russia
Autonomous administrative divisions